Samuel Alfred Ross (October 29, 1870 – December 10, 1929) was an Americo-Liberian politician and journalist who served as the 18th vice president of Liberia from 1920 to 1924 under President Charles D. B. King. Born in Greenville, Sinoe County, Liberia, he was the son of Joseph J. Ross, a native of the state of Georgia in the United States and also a former vice president of Liberia. Prior to his vice presidency, Samuel Ross served in the Senate and as the Liberia's Attorney General. He was presbyterian.

After his political career, Ross was associate editor of the African Agricultural World from 1927 to 1929 and postmaster general from 1928 until his death in 1929. Like many Americo-Liberians, Ross was educated in the United States, studying at Lincoln University in Pennsylvania during the late 1880s.

References

Americo-Liberian people
1870 births
1929 deaths
Vice presidents of Liberia
Speakers of the House of Representatives of Liberia
Members of the Senate of Liberia
People from Sinoe County
Lincoln University (Pennsylvania) alumni
Attorneys general of Liberia
Children of national leaders
20th-century Liberian politicians